Plaster Stadium at SBU is a 3,000-capacity stadium in Bolivar, Missouri, United States, where it serves as home to Southwest Baptist University's football team. The stadium was completed in 1985 and is named for Robert W. Plaster, who was a major contributor to the project.

References

External links
 - Plaster Stadium
 Satellite image from Google Maps

Sports venues in Missouri
College football venues
Southwest Baptist University
Buildings and structures in Polk County, Missouri
Southwest Baptist Bearcats football